Stefania roraimae (common names: Roraima treefrog, Roraima stefania) is a species of frog in the family Hemiphractidae. It is endemic to Guyana. Its type locality is Mount Roraima; it is also known from Mount Ayanganna and Mount Wokomung. It presumably occurs in the adjacent Venezuela and Brazil too.

Description
Reproduction is not known for this species, but presumably the females carry eggs on their backs, with the juveniles developing fully there, as known for many other species of Stefania.

Habitat and conservation
There are no known threats to this species in its relatively remote habitats.

References

roraimae
Endemic fauna of Guyana
Amphibians of Guyana
Amphibians described in 1984
Taxa named by William Edward Duellman
Taxonomy articles created by Polbot
Taxa named by Marinus Steven Hoogmoed
Amphibians of the Tepuis